Cape Belsham is a prominent cape  west of Point Wild on the north coast of Elephant Island, in the South Shetland Islands of Antarctica. The name dates back to about 1822 and is well established in international usage.

More

Cape Belsham is a prominent geographical feature located on the north coast of Elephant Island, which is part of the South Shetland Islands in Antarctica. The cape is located 0.9 km (0.56 mi) west of Point Wild, which is known for being the site of a historic rescue mission during the ill-fated Endurance expedition led by Sir Ernest Shackleton in 1916.

The name "Cape Belsham" dates back to about 1822 and is well established in international usage. It is named after Lieutenant Henry Belsham, a British naval officer who served as a navigator and surveyor in the Royal Navy in the early 19th century. Belsham is credited with producing the first detailed maps of the South Shetland Islands, which were important for subsequent exploration and navigation in the region.

Today, Cape Belsham and the surrounding areas are of interest to scientists and researchers who study the unique ecological systems and wildlife of Antarctica. The region is home to a variety of marine mammals, such as seals and whales, as well as seabirds and penguins. Due to its remote and challenging location, the area is primarily accessible to researchers and explorers who are equipped with specialized equipment and support.

References

Belsham
Elephant Island